Pterostylis prasina, commonly known as the mallee leafy greenhood, is a plant in the orchid family Orchidaceae and is endemic to southern continental Australia. Non-flowering have a rosette of leaves on a short stalk, but flowering plants lack the rosette and have up to eight pale green  and translucent green flowers with darker green lines. The flowers have a pale green labellum with a darker central line. It is a common and widespread greenhood in parts of Victoria and South Australia.

Description
Pterostylis prasina, is a terrestrial,  perennial, deciduous, herb with an underground tuber. The dorsal sepal and petals are fused, forming a hood or "galea" over the column with the dorsal sepal having a short brownish tip on its end. Flowering occurs from July to September.

Taxonomy and naming
The mallee leafy greenhood was first formally described in 2006 by David Jones who gave it the name Bunochilus prasinus and published the description in Australian Orchid Research from a specimen collected near Sherlock. In 2007 Gary Backhouse changed the name to Pterostylis prasina. The specific epithet (prasina) is a Latin word meaning "green" or "leek-green", referring to the colour of the flowers.

Distribution and habitat
Pterostylis prasina is common and widespread in the Little Desert and Big Desert areas of Victoria and the Murray, Yorke Peninsula, South Eastern and possibly Eyre Peninsula botanical regions of South Australia. It grows in plant litter under shrubs and small trees in sandy soil.

References

prasina
Endemic orchids of Australia
Orchids of South Australia
Orchids of Victoria (Australia)
Plants described in 2006